Events from the year 1710 in Great Britain.

Incumbents
 Monarch – Anne
 Parliament – 2nd (until 21 September), 3rd (starting 25 November)

Events
 January – food shortages in major cities due to the harsh winter.
 27 February–21 March – trial of Henry Sacheverell for preaching criticism of the Glorious Revolution which is considered subversive by the Whig government.
 1 March – riots in London, in support of Sacheverell.
 10 April – the Statute of Anne, the world's first copyright legislation, becomes effective.
 19 April – Queen Anne meets the Four Mohawk Kings.
 9 July – Louis XIV of France withdraws from peace negotiations with Britain taking place at Geertruidenberg 
 16 July – War of the Spanish Succession: Battle of Almenar: victory of the Habsburg monarchy in alliance with Britain against Bourbon Spain.
 9 August – War of the Spanish Succession: Battle of Saragossa: victory of the Habsburg monarchy in alliance with Britain against Bourbon Spain.
 11 August – a Tory administration is formed with Robert Harley as Chancellor of the Exchequer following the fall of the Whig government.
 13 October – Queen Anne's War: The French surrender ending the Siege of Port Royal gives the British permanent possession of Nova Scotia.
 25 November – following the general election, the fourth parliament of Queen Anne's reign is composed mainly of Tory MPs.
 8–9 December – War of the Spanish Succession: Battle of Brihuega: The British are defeated by French and Spanish troops.

Publications
 John Arbuthnot's paper An Argument for Divine Providence, Taken From the Constant Regularity Observ'd in the Births of Both Sexes.

Births
 12 March – Thomas Augustine Arne, composer (died 1778)
 15 April – William Cullen, Scottish physician and chemist (died 1790)
 17 April – Henry Erskine, 10th Earl of Buchan, Scottish Freemason (died 1767)
 25 April – James Ferguson, Scottish astronomer (died 1776)
 26 April – Thomas Reid, Scottish philosopher (died 1796)
 16 May – William Talbot, 1st Earl Talbot, politician (died 1782)
 10 June – James Short, mathematician and optician (died 1768)
 13 August – William Heberden, physician (died 1801)
 19 August – Charles Wyndham, 2nd Earl of Egremont, statesman (died 1763)
 20 August – Thomas Simpson, mathematician (died 1761)
 30 September – John Russell, 4th Duke of Bedford, statesman (d. 1771)
 24 October – Alban Butler, Catholic priest and writer (died 1773)
 8 November – Sarah Fielding, writer (died 1768)
 27 November – Robert Lowth, bishop and grammarian (died 1787)

Deaths
 1 January – William Bruce, Scottish architect (born c. 1630)
 5 March – John Holt, Lord Chief Justice (born 1642)
 28 April – Thomas Betterton, English actor (born c. 1635)
 1 June – David Mitchell, Scottish admiral (born 1642)

References

 
Years in Great Britain